
The Safford Mine is an open-pit copper mine located in Graham County, Arizona, eight miles (13 km) north of the city of Safford. The mine is owned and operated by Freeport-McMoran Copper & Gold.

Construction on the Safford mine began in mid-2006. Production began December 26, 2007, with full production started in 2008. It is the first new large-scale copper mining project in Arizona in more than 30 years. In September 2005, as part of the deal, Phelps Dodge (which was subsequently purchased by Freeport-McMoran) transferred  of "environmentally sensitive" land to the Bureau of Land Management (BLM) and purchased , located next to where the mine is located, from the BLM.

The mine composes two porphyry copper deposits (the San Juan and Dos Pobres copper ore bodies) that have leachable oxide and secondary sulfide mineralization. Freeport-McMoran estimates that it will remove 205 to 240 million pounds of copper from the deposits annually between 2008 and 2011.  

In 2016, copper production at Safford was 230 million pounds. In 2017, copper production was 150 million pounds, and approximately 830 people were employed there.

Geography and facilities

The mine is served by a branch of the Arizona Eastern Railway.

See also
 Copper mining in Arizona

References

External links
 Safford Mine information – Freeport-McMoran Copper & Gold

Copper mines in Arizona
Phelps Dodge
Geography of Graham County, Arizona
Surface mines in the United States
Buildings and structures in Graham County, Arizona
2007 establishments in Arizona
Freeport-McMoRan mines